Psilostomidae is a family of trematodes belonging to the order Plagiorchiida.

Genera

Genera:
 Apopharynx Lühe, 1909
 Astacatrematula Macy & Bell, 1968
 Astacotrema Warren, 1903

References

Plagiorchiida